Palaeophonus (meaning "ancient killer") is the oldest known genus of scorpions.

Fossil records

This genus is known in the fossil record from the Silurian to the Carboniferous (age range: 428.2 to 314.6 million years ago). Fossils have been found in Europe, the United States, and Canada.

Description
Palaeophonus was virtually identical to modern scorpions. These animals did not have eyes and therefore they were blind.

Palaeophonus seems to have been terrestrial.

Species

Species within this genus include:

†P. arctus Matthew 1894
†P. lightbodyi Kjellesvig-Waering 1954
†P. nuncius Thorell and Lindström 1884
†P. osborni Whitfield 1885

References

Frank H.T. Rodes, Herbert S. Zim en Paul R. Shaffer (1993) - Natuurgids Fossielen (het ontstaan, prepareren en rangschikken van fossielen), Zuidnederlandse Uitgeverij N.V., Aartselaar. ISBN D-1993-0001-361
s:The Scottish Silurian Scorpion R. I. Pocock, 1901

Prehistoric arachnid genera
Scorpion genera
Prehistoric scorpions
Devonian animals of Europe
Paleozoic arthropods of Europe
Wenlock first appearances
Early Devonian genus extinctions
Fossil taxa described in 1884
Paleozoic life of New Brunswick
Bertie Formation